Peter Kurth  (born 5 April 1960) is a German politician (CDU) who served as State Minister of Finance (Senator) in Berlin from 1999 until 2001.

Career
Peter Kurth studied law and political science both in Bonn and in Freiburg. Following a traineeship in Berlin, he carried out various activities insocial and business administration in the State of Berlin.

From 1994, Kurth served as State Secretary to the successive State Ministers of Finance Elmar Pieroth (1994-1996) and Annette Fugmann-Heesing (1996-1999) in the government of Mayor Eberhard Diepgen.

From 2001 until 2009, Kurth was a member of the board of Alba Group in Berlin.

Other activities

Corporate boards
 Deutsche Bank, Member of the Advisory Board
 KfW, Member of the Board of Supervisory Directors (1999–2001)

Non-profit organizations
 Federation of German Industries (BDI), Member of the Presidium (2017-2019)
 European Federation of Waste Management and Environmental Services (FEAD), vice-president (since 2009)
 German RETech Partnership, Member of the Advisory Board

References 

1960 births
Senators of Berlin
Christian Democratic Union of Germany politicians
Living people
LGBT conservatism
German LGBT politicians
Gay politicians